Blood of Manis the eighth album by Mason Jennings. It was released in 2009 by Brushfire Records. Jennings recorded all of the instruments on the album himself and the album has a more extensive use of electric guitars than his previous two albums. Jennings referred to the album's subject matter in a short film titled "Blood of Man", where he stated that he drew heavily on childhood experiences.

On June 2, 2009, the single "Sunlight" was released on iTunes with all proceeds to go to the Surfrider Foundation in efforts to help clean up beaches around America.

Track listing 
All tracks by Mason Jennings
"City of Ghosts" – 3:13
"Pittsburgh" – 3:55
"The Field" – 5:37
"Tourist" – 3:20
"Black Wind Blowing" – 4:47
"Ain't No Friend of Mine" – 3:12
"Sing Out" – 4:27
"Sunlight" – 4:32
"Lonely Road" – 4:04
"Blood of Man" – 5:04
"Waves" – 2:36 (iTunes bonus track)

Personnel 
Mason Jennings - producer, writer, recording, performer
Daniel Field - photography, art direction
Alex Field - design, layout
Johannes Gamble - design, layout
Danny Clinch - color photograph
Scott Soens - B&W photograph

References

External links
 

2009 albums
Mason Jennings albums
Brushfire Records albums